The following is a list of Indian podcasts that are either created by or about Indian people.

List

See also 

 Podcasting in India
 Media of India
 Radio in India

References

External links 
  on Player FM

Indian
Mass media in India
Podcasts